The National Symphony Orchestra of Cuba is the main institution dedicated to the performance of classical music in Cuba

History 
Heir to the tradition of excellency established by its ancestor, the Havana Philharmonic Orchestra, the National Symphony Orchestra of Cuba was founded on October 7, 1959 by the Concert Masters Enrique González Mántici and Manuel Duchesce Cuzán.

The activities of the orchestra include regular season concerts as well as Symphonic-Choral concerts, didactical concerts cycles, national tours and the support to lyrical presentations and ballet. We can also mention the recording of soundtracks, record productions and the participation in national and international events.

The orchestra has been conducted by numerous national and international Concert Masters, such as: Francesco Belli, Carmine Coppola, Luis de Pablo, Álvaro Manzano, Manuel Duchesne Cuzán, Tomás Fortín, Yoshikazu Fukumura, Enrique González Mántici, Luis Gorelik, Camargo Guarnieri, Félix Guerrero, Michel Legrand, Joel Mathias Jenny, Jean-Paul Pénin, Gonzalo Romeu, Bernard Rubinstein, David Harutyunyan, Roberto Sánchez Ferrer and Hans Werner Henze.

It has also presented a large number of renowned soloists from Cuba and abroad, among whom we can mention:  Zuill Bailey, José Carreras, Joaquín Clerch, Costas Cotsiolis, Victoria de los Ángeles, Frank Fernández (pianist), Eric Grossman, Víctor Pellegrini, Iván Petruzziello, Jorge Luis Prats, İdil Biret, Francesco Manara, Mistislav Rostropovich, Chucho Valdés, José María Vitier, Sergio Vitier, Miguel Villafruela and Roger Woodward.

Since its inception, The National Symphony Orchestra of Cuba has made an important effort to promote Cuban music. In its concerts numerous contemporary pieces have been premiered, such as: "La tradición se rompe, pero cuesta trabajo" and "Concierto para guitarra y orquesta No. 1", by Leo Brouwer, "Muros, rejas y vitrales" by Carlos Fariñas, "Contrapunto Espacial" by Juan Blanco, "Conjuro" by Roberto Valera, "Oda al soldado muerto" by Sergio Barroso and "Ciclos" by Armando Rodríguez Ruidíaz.

The orchestra regularly features many Cuban conductors such as: Zenaida Romeu, Iván del Prado, Guido López-Gavilán, Jorge López Marín and  Leo Brouwer, as well as his Chief Conductor, Enrique Pérez Mesa. The National Symphony Orchestra of Cuba has its permanent headquarters at the "Auditorio Amadeo Roldán" Theater in Havana.

References

Culture in Havana
Symphony orchestras
Musical groups established in 1959
1959 establishments in Cuba